U239 or U-239 may be:

 , a German U-boat of World War II
 Uranium-239 (U-239 or 239U), an isotope of uranium